Håkan Malmrot (29 November 1900 – 10 January 1987) was a Swedish breaststroke swimmer. He won two gold medals at the 1920 Summer Olympics in Antwerp, in the 200 m and 400 m events, both times with Swedish Thor Henning as silver medalist. In 1980 Malmrot was inducted to the International Swimming Hall of Fame.

See also
 List of members of the International Swimming Hall of Fame

References

1900 births
1987 deaths
Swedish male breaststroke swimmers
Olympic swimmers of Sweden
Medalists at the 1920 Summer Olympics
Swimmers at the 1920 Summer Olympics
Olympic gold medalists for Sweden
Olympic gold medalists in swimming
Sportspeople from Örebro